The Valentines were an Australian pop band active from 1966–1970, chiefly noted for their lead singers, Bon Scott, who later went on to great success as lead vocalist with AC/DC; and Vince Lovegrove, who subsequently became a successful music journalist and manager of Divinyls.

Band history
The band was formed in late 1966 with the amalgamation of Perth groups The Spektors and The Winstons.  They capitalised on the success of both the former bands, plus the interest created by having two lead singers in Scott and Lovegrove.  Inspired by The Rolling Stones, The Beatles, and local stars The Easybeats, they enjoyed considerable local success and released a few singles.

In late 1967, The Valentines moved to Melbourne in search of greater success, and soon toured other major cities.  With a development towards the popular Bubblegum sound late in 1968, the band became more in demand, particularly among teenage girls.  However, as the fashion for bubblegum music wore off, The Valentines struggled to retain their musical credibility despite a turn towards rock music.  With differing opinions within the band concerning musical direction, and a much-publicised drugs bust in September 1969, group stability began to suffer. Although they still had a strong fanbase in certain areas of the country, especially back home in Perth, The Valentines decided to disband amicably in August 1970.

Scott had built a strong reputation as a powerful vocalist and soon joined Fraternity, and later AC/DC. Lovegrove found success as a music journalist, and guitarist Wyn Milsom became a sound engineer.

Personnel 
Bon Scott – vocals (1966–1970; Died 1980)
Vince Lovegrove – vocals (1966–1970; Died 2012)
Wyn Milsom – guitar (1966–1970)
Ted Ward – guitar (1966–1969), bass guitar (1969–1970)
Bruce Abbott – bass guitar (1966–1968)
Warwick Findlay – drums (1966–1968)
John Cooksey – bass guitar (1968–1969)
Doug Lavery – drums (1968–1969)
Paddy Beach – drums (1969–1970)

Discography

Compilation albums

Extended plays

Singles

Other songs
 "Sooky Sooky" (Don Covay) – (1968)
 "Build Me Up Buttercup" (Mike d'Abo, Tony Macaulay) – (live TV appearance 1969)
 "Things Go Better with Coke" (Coca-Cola jingle) – (1969)

See also

References

Highway to Hell: The Life and Times of AC/DC Legend Bon Scott – Clinton Walker, 1994. 
Fraternity: Pub Rock Pioneers - Victor Marshall, 2021. ISBN 978-1920785109

External links
 The Valentines Official Website
 The Valentines Official Facebook
 "'The Valentines', Bon Scott (centre), Vince Lovegrove (reaching into crowd) with drummer Warwick Finlay, lead guitar Wyn Milson and guitarist Ted Ward (Ted Junko), 1966", photo, part of collection Hoadley's 'Battle of the Sounds' at Ambassadors Theatre, held by State Library of Western Australia.

Australian rock music groups
Western Australian musical groups
Musical groups established in 1966
Musical groups disestablished in 1970
1966 establishments in Australia
1970 disestablishments in Australia